The 2022–23 season is the 7th season in the history of RB Leipzig Women and their third consecutive season in the second division. The club are participating in the 2. Frauen-Bundesliga and the DFB-Pokal Frauen.

On 10 June 2022, the club announced that Saban Uzan would be the team's new coach after Katja Greulich left the post to take the same job at FC Basel. Uzan returns to management after a sabbatical having previously managed VfL Sindelfingen's women's team in the Frauen-Bundesliga and Wolfsburg's U-23 squad.

Competitions

Overall record

2. Frauen-Bundesliga

League table

DFB-Pokal Frauen

References

Women 2022-23